The Lucknow Junction–Kathgodam Express is an Express train belonging to North Eastern Railway zone that runs between  and  in India. It is currently being operated with 15043/15044 train numbers on a tri-weekly basis.

Service

The 15043/Lucknow Jn.–Kathgodam Express has an average speed of 34 km/hr and covers 341 km in 10h 5m. The 15044/Kathgodam–Lucknow Jn. Express has an average speed of 44 km/hr and covers 341 km in 7h 50m.

Route and halts 

The important halts of the train are:

Coach composition

The train has standard ICF rakes with a max speed of 110 kmph. The train consists of 17 coaches:

 1 AC II Tier
 3 AC Chair Car
 2 Second Sitting
 3 Sleeper coaches
 6 General Unreserved
 2 Seating cum Luggage Rake

Traction

Both trains are hauled by a Gonda Loco Shed-based WDM-3A diesel locomotive from Lucknow to Kathgodam and vice versa.

See also 

 Lucknow Junction railway station
 Kathgodam railway station

Notes

References

External links 

 15043/Lucknow Jn.–Kathgodam Express India Rail Info
 15044/Kathgodam–Lucknow Jn. Express India Rail Info

Passenger trains originating from Lucknow
Transport in Haldwani-Kathgodam
Express trains in India
Rail transport in Uttarakhand
Railway services introduced in 2015